Brokaw is a surname. Notable people with the surname include:

 Ann Clare Brokaw (1924–1944), the only child of Clare Boothe Luce and George Tuttle Brokaw
 Charles Brokaw, author of the Thomas Lourds book series
 Chris Brokaw (born 1964), American musician, mostly known for his work with the bands Come and Codeine
 Gary Brokaw (born 1954), retired American basketball player and a basketball coach
 George Tuttle Brokaw (1879–1935), American lawyer and sportsman
 Isaac Brokaw (1746–1826), New Jersey clockmaker
 Isaac Vail Brokaw (1835–1913), New York City clothing merchant
 Irving Brokaw (1871–1939), American figure skater, artist, lawyer, and financier
 Mark Brokaw, stage director
 Norman Brokaw (1927–2016), American talent agent
 Paul Brokaw, expert on integrated circuit design
 Tom Brokaw (born 1940), American television journalist and author notable for hosting NBC Nightly News